The  was held on 29 January 1984 in Kanagawa Prefectural Youth Centre Hall, Yokohama, Kanagawa, Japan.

Awards
 Best Film: The Family Game
 Best Actor: Yūsaku Matsuda – The Family Game
 Best Actress: Eiko Nagashima – Ryūji
 Best New Actress:
Yukari Usami – Miyuki	
Tomoyo Harada – Toki o Kakeru Shōjo
 Best Supporting Actor: Juzo Itami – The Family Game, The Makioka Sisters
 Best Supporting Actress: Misako Tanaka – Ushimitsu no Mura
 Best Director: Yoshimitsu Morita – The Family Game
 Best Screenplay: Yoshimitsu Morita – The Family Game
 Best Cinematography: Yonezo Maeda – The Family Game
 Best Independent Film: - Ryūji
 Special Jury Prize: Shōji Kaneko – For his talent.
 Special Prize:
Haruki Kadokawa (Career)
Yoichi Maeda (Career)

Best 10
 The Family Game
 Toki o Kakeru Shōjo
 Ryūji
 Orecchi no Wedding
 The Catch
 Blow The Night!: Yoru o Buttobase
 10-kai no Mosquito
 The Makioka Sisters
 Double Bed
 Merry Christmas, Mr. Lawrence
runner-up. Shonben Rider

References

Yokohama Film Festival
Yokohama Film Festival
Yokohama Film Festival
Yokohama Film Festival